Jeremy David Pugh (born 4 March 1960) is a former international rugby union player. He played for the Wales national rugby union team in the late 1980s.

Pugh played his club rugby for Neath. He first played for Wales in 1987 against the USA. Altogether he won three caps. He played his last international match against Scotland on 3 March 1990.

In 2006 Pugh was one of three former international rugby players to climb Mount Kilimanjaro to raise money for the NSPCC. Pugh later became a property developer in Builth Wells and, in May 2017, was elected to Powys County Council as an independent councillor for the town.

References

1960 births
Living people
Rugby union players from Builth Wells
Rugby union props
Wales international rugby union players
Welsh rugby union players